Clinohelea bimaculata is a species of biting midges in the family Ceratopogonidae from North America.

References

Further reading

 
 

Ceratopogonidae
Diptera of North America
Insects described in 1861
Taxa named by Hermann Loew
Articles created by Qbugbot